IDBI Capital Markets & Securities  Ltd.(formerly known as "IDBI Capital Market Services Limited"), a wholly owned subsidiary of IDBI Bank, is a fully integrated financial services provider catering to retail, institutional and corporate clients. Incorporated in December 1993, today it has a net worth of around INR 3 billion and employs over 200 employees in 15 branches across India.

History
IDBI Capital Markets & Securities Ltd.(formerly known as "IDBI Capital Market Services Limited"),  incorporated in December 1993, today it has a net worth of around INR 3 billion and employs over 200 employees in 18 branches across India.

The online investing portal of IDBI Capital was launched in January 2006.

Management
1.	Mr. Rakesh sharma – Chairman

2.	Mr. Samuel Joseph J. – Director

3.	Ms. Lalitha Rameswaran – Independent Director

4.	Ms. Uma Shankar - Independent Director

5.	Mr. Venkat Chalasani - Independent Director

6.	Mr. Kamal Kant Upadhyay – MD & CEO

Business
The Retail Broking & Distribution division of IDBI Capital offers online trading in Equities, F&O, Mutual Funds and IPOs, through the investing portal. It also distribute various Third Party Products, like Fixed Income Products, Mutual Funds, etc. It is amongst the MF distributors in India. 
IDBI Capital offers products and services to Corporates, Institutional and Individual clients. The range of services include :-
Stock Broking-institutional and Retail
Distribution of Financial Products
Merchant Banking
Corporate Advisory Services
Mergers & Acquisitions
Project Appraisals & Debt Syndication
Portfolio Management Services
Capital Market Products
Debt Placement and Underwriting
Fund Management (Managing Clients' Assets-Pension/PF Fund Managers)
Research Services

References

Financial services companies based in Mumbai
1993 establishments in Maharashtra
Financial services companies established in 1993
Indian companies established in 1993

Social Media Link

Linkedin : https://www.linkedin.com/company/idbi-capital/

Instagram : https://www.instagram.com/idbidirect/

Twitter : https://twitter.com/idbidirect?t=7iEok6X--MFtvo3-exN7FA&s=09

Youtube : https://www.youtube.com/channel/UCvaMp3pA5mwXLswcI87PiGw

Telegram - https://t.me/idbicapital